A list of films produced in the Cinema of Austria in the 1930s ordered by year of release. For an alphabetical list of articles on Austrian films see :Category:Austrian films.

1930

1931

1932

1933

1934

1935

1936

1937

1938

1939

References

External links
 Austrian film at the Internet Movie Database
http://www.austrianfilm.com/

1930s
Austrian
Films